Paul Robert Spike is an American author, editor in chief and journalist. He is best known as the author of the 1973 memoir Photographs of My Father about the murder of his father, civil rights leader Robert W. Spike, in 1966.

Career

Spike is the author of five books. His memoir Photographs of My Father (Knopf, 1973) is the most widely known; an autobiographical account of the murder of his father, civil rights leader Rev. Robert W. Spike, the book received exceptional praise and was chosen by the New York Public Library as one of its "Ten Best Books of The Year."

His four other works include a collection of short stories, two political thrillers, and the cult novelization of Terry Gilliam's Jabberwocky. (Spike composed under the pseudonym "Ralph Hoover.")

In 1997, Spike became the first American editor of the 150-year-old British humour magazine Punch which he relaunched as a weekly investigative and satirical gadfly, but soon left after falling out with its controversial owner Mohamed Al-Fayed.

Honors
Spike has received the Paris Review Humor Prize.

Personal
Spike graduated from Columbia University in 1970. He has a son and a daughter by author Maureen Freely, and a son by editor Alexandra Shulman, both former wives. His brother is art historian John Spike.

Bibliography
 Bad News  (short fiction), Holt Rinehart and Winston, 1971.
 Photographs of My Father  (autobiography), Knopf, 1973.
 Jabberwocky (as "Ralph Hoover"), Pan Books, 1976.
 The Night Letter (novel), GP Putnams, 1978.
 Last Rites (novel), New American Library, 1980.

References

Living people
Alumni of St Catherine's College, Oxford
American editors
American male journalists
Columbia College (New York) alumni
People from Greenwich Village
Punch (magazine) people
1947 births